Reza Rezaeimanesh (born July 2, 1969) is an Iranian retired football Right wingback. He played for Esteghlal Jonub Tehran F.C., Pas F.C., Bahman F.C. and the Iranian national football team. He also had a stint with Singaporean side Geylang in 1997.

References

External links

1969 births
Living people
Iranian footballers
Iran international footballers
Pas players
Iranian expatriate footballers
Bahman players
Geylang International FC players
Association football defenders